Orcha may refer to:

Orcha (Chrono Cross), a character in the PlayStation game Chrono Cross
Orsha, a city in Belarus
Orchha, a town in Madhya Pradesh, India, formerly the capital of Orchha State
Orchha State, a princely state of Bundelkhand, Madhya Pradesh, India